Ezzatabad may refer to various places in Iran:
 Ezzatabad, Chaharmahal and Bakhtiari
 Ezzatabad, Gilan
 Ezzatabad-e Sharm Dasht, Gilan Province
 Ezzatabad, Hormozgan
 Ezzatabad, Kerman
 Ezzatabad, Markazi
 Ezzatabad, Mazandaran
 Ezzatabad, Razavi Khorasan
 Ezzatabad, Khoy, West Azerbaijan Province
 Ezzatabad, Showt, West Azerbaijan Province